Safiabad (also Romanized as Şafīābād) is a village in Torqabeh Rural District, Torqabeh District, Torqabeh and Shandiz County, Razavi Khorasan Province, Iran. At the 2006 census, its population was 67, in 16 families.

References 

Populated places in Torqabeh and Shandiz County